Sir Stanley Jeffrey Burnton (born 25 October 1942) is a British lawyer and former Lord Justice of Appeal.

Early life
Burnton was educated at Hackney Downs Grammar School. He studied jurisprudence at St Edmund Hall, Oxford, and graduated from the University of Oxford 1964 with a first class Bachelor of Arts (BA) degree.

Legal career
Burnton was called to the bar (Middle Temple) in 1965 and was made a Bencher in 1991. He was appointed as Queen's Counsel in 1982, and was a Recorder from 1994 to 2000.

Burnton was appointed a High Court judge on 19 July 2000, receiving the customary knighthood, and assigned to the Queen's Bench Division. He was promoted, being named a Lord Justice of Appeal on 21 April 2008. He stepped down as a judge in 2012.

On 4 November 2015, Burnton was appointed as the Interception of Communications Commissioner.

Honours
Burnton is an Honorary Fellow of St Edmund Hall, Oxford.

References

1942 births
Living people
People educated at Hackney Downs School
Alumni of St Edmund Hall, Oxford
British King's Counsel
Knights Bachelor
Members of the Privy Council of the United Kingdom
Queen's Bench Division judges
20th-century King's Counsel
Lords Justices of Appeal
Members of the Middle Temple